Kanok Koryangphueak (born September 25, 1989) is a Thai professional footballer who plays as a Left Back

References

External links
  at Soccerway

1989 births
Living people
Kanok Koryangphueak
Association football fullbacks
Kanok Koryangphueak
Kanok Koryangphueak
Kanok Koryangphueak